During the 1983–84 English football season, Brentford competed in the Football League Third Division. A season of transition ended with a narrow escape from relegation.

Season summary 

After two seasons in which, were not for bad mid-season form, strong run-ins may have yielded a promotion challenge, Brentford manager Fred Callaghan kept his squad together. Save for the retirement of key midfielder Stan Bowles, his replacement with Terry Bullivant was the only significant piece of transfer activity at Griffin Park during the 1983 off-season. Goalkeeper Trevor Swinburne arrived to provide competition for Paddy Roche and with forward Tony Mahoney still not fully fit after recovering from a broken leg, Bill Garner was brought in from non-League football on non-contract terms.

Brentford showed poor form between the beginning of the season and Christmas Eve 1983, winning just two and losing 10 of the opening 19 Third Division and sitting just above the foot of the table. In the midst of the barren run in the league, a two-legged tie with then-First Division champions Liverpool in the second round of the League Cup failed to produce much cheer, with the Bees suffering an 8–1 aggregate defeat. A reduction in size of Griffin Park in the intervening years meant that the 17,858 crowd which attended the first leg has not been bettered since.

Player/assistant manager Ron Harris was replaced with former Brentford manager Frank Blunstone in October 1983 and Harris later remarked that it had been an acrimonious parting. An ever-increasing list of injuries and suspensions led manager Fred Callaghan to make a number of signings during the final two months of 1983, including new captain Ian Bolton for £2,000 and previously on-loan defender Paul Roberts from Millwall for a £10,000 fee. Stan Bowles came out of retirement to assist the team on a non-contract basis. The signings had an effect, with the Bees going four matches undefeated in late December 1983 and early January 1984 to rise out of the relegation places. Defeats in the following two matches led chairman Martin Lange to act and sack manager Fred Callaghan on 2 February, though he paid tribute to Callaghan by stating that Callaghan could "leave the club proud in the knowledge that he leaves the club far better equipped than when he arrived".

Assistant Frank Blunstone took caretaker charge of the team for one match before the appointment of former Leicester City manager Frank McLintock on 9 February, who installed former Brentford player John Docherty as his assistant. McLintock took over a club in 21st position with 20 matches to play and conducted an overhaul of the playing staff, selling centre back Alan Whitehead and bringing in right back Bobby Fisher midfielder Tommy Finney from Cambridge United, plus Nigel Gray and Bill Roffey on loan. Attacker Bob Booker was recalled to the starting lineup, Ian Bolton and Tony Mahoney were dropped, Terry Bullivant and Graham Wilkins departed on loan and Stan Bowles retired for a second time.

A slight upturn in form meant that Brentford went into their final match of the season versus Walsall perched atop the relegation zone in 20th place and needing a victory, but a 1–1 draw was all that could be mustered. Circumstances transpired that 21st-place Scunthorpe United's 1–1 draw on the same day meant that the Iron would need to win their final match of the season by seven goals, which effectively guaranteed the Bees' safety. Brentford's Third Division status was retained when Scunthorpe United lost their final match of the season on the following Tuesday night.

League table

Results
Brentford's goal tally listed first.

Legend

Pre-season and friendlies

Football League Third Division

FA Cup

Football League Cup

Football League Trophy 

 Sources: 100 Years of Brentford, The Big Brentford Book of the Eighties,Croxford, Lane & Waterman, p. 394-396. Statto

Playing squad 
Players' ages are as of the opening day of the 1983–84 season.

 Sources: The Big Brentford Book of the Eighties, Timeless Bees

Coaching staff

Fred Callaghan (27 August 1983 – 2 February 1984)

Frank Blunstone (2 – 9 February 1984)

Frank McLintock (9 February – 12 May 1984)

Statistics

Appearances and goals
Substitute appearances in brackets.

Players listed in italics left the club mid-season.
Source: The Big Brentford Book of the Eighties

Goalscorers 

Players listed in italics left the club mid-season.
Source: The Big Brentford Book of the Eighties

Management

Summary

Transfers & loans

Awards 
 Supporters' Player of the Year: Chris Kamara
 Players' Player of the Year: Chris Kamara

References 

Brentford F.C. seasons
Brentford